John H. Larsen Jr. (born 18 August 1943) is a Norwegian former sports shooter. He competed in the 50 metre running target event at the 1972 Summer Olympics. His father, John Larsen, also represented Norway at the Olympics in the shooting competition.

References

1943 births
Living people
Norwegian male sport shooters
Olympic shooters of Norway
Shooters at the 1972 Summer Olympics
Sportspeople from Oslo
20th-century Norwegian people